Southampton High School may refer to:
Southampton High School (Southampton, New York)
Southampton High School (Courtland, Virginia)